The following is a list of game boards of the Parker Brothers/Hasbro board game Monopoly adhering to a particular theme or particular locale in Europe. Lists for other regions can be found here. The game is licensed in 103 countries and printed in 37 languages. The longest-produced and most commercially successful edition in the UK and Commonwealth Countries is the original London version published in 1935.

Austria

Belgium 
There have been several editions of Belgian boards. They used to be either in Dutch or in French. Recent editions use bilingual game boards. Street names are taken from cities across the country, equally divided between the Dutch and French speaking halves of the kingdom. There are a few city editions also. All together -special editions included- there are some 53 listed versions using these variants, including translations of other variants (FIFA World Cup, Star Wars, etc.).

The currency values in the Belgian editions used to be francs. The bills that came with the set showed 20, 100, 200, 400, 1,000, 2,000, and 10,000 francs. The property and penalty prices are presumed to match the new billset, with the starting cash equal to 30,000 francs (1,500 x 20).
Now the currency is the euro. Bills are the 500, 100, 50, 20, 10 and 1 euro coins with starting cash of 1500 euro.

City Editions 
Starting in 2000, Hasbro and TFL Games began releasing special -opoly editions based on cities in Belgium. The original Brussels edition got a facelift with a new board and standard dollar values and playing pieces. A number of Wallonian cities also got special editions, including Namur (capital of Wallonia), Liège, Charleroi, and Arlon, all in the Walloon Region along with 3 Flemish cities Antwerp, Ghent and Ieper

Arlon Edition

Charleroi Edition

Ghent Edition

Liège Edition

Namur Edition

Ieper Edition

Croatia

Czech Republic 
Prague

Denmark 

Odense A localized version was published in the 1980s, known as Kong Gulerod i Odense

Estonia

Europe

Finland

France 

Alsace Edition

Amiens Edition

Angers Edition

Avignon Edition

Bassin d'Arcachon Edition

Beauvais Edition

Besançon Edition

Bordeaux Edition

Brest Edition

Brittany Edition

Caen Edition

Camargue Edition

Chamonix Edition

Corse Edition

Dijon Edition

Dunkerque Edition

Gironde Edition

Grenoble Edition

Le Havre Edition

Lille Edition

Lorraine Edition

Marseille Edition

Metz Edition

Montcuq Edition

Montpellier Edition

Nantes Edition

Nice Edition

Nîmes Edition

Nord-Pas de Calais Edition

Orléans Edition

Pays Basque Edition

Périgord Edition

Poitou Edition

Reims Edition

Rennes Edition

Saint-Étienne Edition

Strasbourg Edition

Toulon Edition

Tours Edition

Vendée Edition

Versailles Edition

Germany 

Aachen Edition

Aschaffenburg Edition

Baden-Baden Edition

Berlin Edition, including the 70th Anniversary Edition (Monopoly Heute or Monopoly Today)

Bremen Edition

Coburg Edition

Dresden Edition

Düsseldorf Edition

Essen Edition

Freiburg Edition

Fulda Edition

Giessen Edition

Göppingen Edition 

Hanover Edition

Heidelberg Edition

Heilbronn Edition

Ingolstadt Edition

Karlsruhe Edition

Kassel Edition

Kiel Edition

Leipzig Edition

Lübeck Edition

Magdeburg Edition

Mainz Edition

Munich Edition

Nuremberg Edition

Oberhausen Edition

Regensburg Edition

Rostock Edition

Wiesbaden Edition

Wuppertal Edition

Würzburg Edition

Gibraltar 
Rockopoly - Monopoly version of Gibraltar

Greece 
Athens - Monopoly today version (Monopoly - Modern Greece, Μονόπολη - Σύγχρονη Ελλάδα) features city landmarks from Athens, Thessaloniki and Patras as well as place names around Greece. Currency is circulated by the use of plastic credit cards.

Hungary

Iceland

Ireland 
For the Republic of Ireland (and not including Northern Ireland) in three versions, Irish pound (now discontinued) and euro, and a 'Here and Now' edition, with updated landmarks, and all monetary values multiplied by a factor of 10,000. Original version used mainly Dublin placenames, except for the red squares which were from Cork, and Shannon Airport as a station. On the new Irish language version published in 2015 by Glór na nGael Monopoly Dollars are used, to avoid any need for euro or sterling currencies, as the board is an all Ireland version.

Isle Of Man

Italy

Lithuania

Luxembourg

Malta

Netherlands 

Netherlands Edition - Every color group is a city; from cheap to expensive: Ons Dorp (='our village') (Dorpsstraat, Brink), Arnhem (Velperplein, Ketelstraat, Steenstraat), Haarlem (Barteljorisstraat, Zijlweg, Grote & Kleine Houtstraat), Utrecht (Neude, Vreeburg, Biltstraat) Groningen (A Kerkhof, Grote Markt, Heerestraat), The Hague (Spui, Plein, Lange Poten), Rotterdam (Hofplein, Blaak, Coolsingel), Amsterdam (Leidsestraat, Kalverstraat).

Amsterdam Edition

Breda Edition

Eindhoven Edition (2012)

Frisian edition Edition

The Hague Edition

Harlingen edition (28 nov 2020)

Hoeksche Waard Edition

Haarlem Edition

Maastricht Edition

Nieuwegein Edition

Nijmegen Edition

Rotterdam Edition

Utrecht Edition

Gouda Edition

Elburg Edition

Norway

Poland 

Gdańsk Edition

Gdynia Edition (2020)

Wrocław Edition

Portugal

Romania 
Bucharest Edition - Produced by Hasbro in 2005. The most expensive property is Bulevardul Primăverii (Spring Avenue) and the cheapest is Rahova.

Russia 
Known as: МОНОПОЛИЯ. Special limited edition - Moscow. At the start of the 1990s an edition called Manager was produced, featuring different factories of Leningrad.

Serbia

Slovakia 
Bratislava

Spain 
Barcelona, Murcia, Vigo, Seville, Málaga, Bilbao, Valencia, Zaragoza, Ibiza and Palma de Mallorca editions. The 70th anniversary edition includes the capital cities of the autonomous communities instead of streets. There is also an edition about the Spain national football team.

Sweden 

Stockholm Edition

Switzerland 

Geneva Edition

Turkey

United Kingdom

England 

1999 Rugby World Cup (1999)

Butlins 80th anniversary (2016)

Coronation Street Edition

Desi (2005)

Marshalls Natural Stone Paving (2010) - "We've Paved the Monopoly Board" - Limited edition of 250 sets manufactured for Marshalls Natural Stone Paving. Each traditional Monopoly street shows a photograph and the name of a Marshalls paving product actually laid in that street in London.

Premier League 1999/2000 (1999)

Premier League 2000/2001 (2000)

Howard DeWalden Estate

Mega Edition (2007)

Thomas Cook (2005)

Towns and Cities 
Bath (2007)

University of Birmingham (limited edition 2003) 

Black Country (2019)

Blackpool (2010)

Bournemouth & Poole (2007)

Brighton & Hove (2003)

Carlisle (2007)

Coventry (2002)

Chelmsford (2012)

East Grinstead (2007)

Exeter (2015)

Falmouth (2019)

Ipswich (2006)

Kingston upon Hull (2004)

Huddersfield (announced 2018)

Hull City Football Club Edition

Lancashire Edition

Lancaster University Edition

Everton F. C. (2008)

Liverpool F. C. European Champions (2005)

Liverpool F. C. (2007)

London Underground Edition - replaces streets with Underground stations, with colours matching lines

King's College London Edition (2004) 

Arsenal Football Club Edition (2002, 2007)

Arsenal - Farewell to Highbury (2005)

Chelsea Football Club Edition (2001, 2004)

Fulham F.C. Edition (2009)

Tottenham Hotspur Football Club Edition

Manchester United Football Club (1999, 2000, 2003, 2005, 2007, 2009) Edition

Middlesbrough (2006)

Newcastle & Gateshead (2000)

Newcastle United Football Club Edition (2006)
Norwich (2002)

Oundle

Portsmouth

Plymouth (2011)

Reading (2003)

Scarborough (2019)

St Mawes, Cornwall  March (2012)

Sheffield (2007) (limited edition)

Southampton (2004)

Stoke-on-Trent

Sunderland (2004)

Taunton (2017)

Weymouth & Portland (2012)

Wigan (2005)

Worcester (2006)

Wolverhampton(2013)

York (2010)

Counties 
Isle of Wight Edition

Devon (2002)

Durham

Gloucestershire (2003)

Somerset

Yorkshire Building Society (1999)

Scotland 

Aberdeen (2006)

Dundee (2012)

Inverness  (1999)

Isle of Arran (2010)

Isle of Islay (2012)

Highlands and Islands (2010)

Stirling (2017)

(Glasgow) Rangers F. C. (2000)

Yorkshire Building Society (1999)

Celtic F. C. (2001, 2004)

Wales 

Anglesey (2011)

Cardiff (2009)

Newport (2014)

Swansea (2005)

Northern Ireland 

Belfast (2009)

The Glór na nGael Irish language edition (2015; see #Ireland) is an all-Ireland edition and so includes some sites in Northern Ireland (Rathlin Island, Stormont, Ulster, Armagh cathedral, the Giant's Causeway).

Channel Islands 

A Jersey edition, with locations from around Jersey, including streets and landmarks, was issued in 2004. The stations are replaced by Jersey airport, two harbours and a lighthouse.

There have also been two different versions for Guernsey. A late 1990s version and an early 2010s updated version. Landmarks include Fort Grey and Castle Cornet and differ with design and some landmarks between the two different version but the majority is the same.

Yugoslavia (SFRY) 
See Croatia and Serbia

References

External links 
 Over 1700 Monopoly versions, updated continuously (some unofficial)
 Database of street names in local editions
 Monopoly games and places from around the world
 Rich Man series review (Chinese)
 Bucharest Version: Detailed article
 MONOPOLY around the World and a contact for different MONOPOLY boards
 Nearly one hundred monopoly boards listed at MonopolyBoards.Info

Monopoly (game)
Monopoly

it:Edizioni del Monopoli